Stiftungsfest is a "Founder's Day" celebration held in Norwood Young America, Minnesota, United States, on the last full weekend of August every year. The first Stiftungsfest was held in 1861. It is Minnesota's oldest celebration.

The Stiftungsfest highlights the German heritage of the city. It features old-time and polka bands from across the United States and Germany as well as ethnic food.

The celebration went on hiatus in 1917–18, 1942–45, and 2020.

References

External links
 Stiftungsfest

1861 establishments in Minnesota
Cultural festivals in the United States
Festivals in Minnesota
German-American culture in Minnesota
Recurring events established in 1861
Tourist attractions in Carver County, Minnesota
Norwood Young America, Minnesota